Isabelle Lonvis-Rome (née Lonvis; born 29 April 1963) is a French politician. She was appointed Minister for Gender Equality, Diversity and Equal Opportunities in the Borne government in May 2022.

References 

Living people
1963 births
21st-century French politicians
21st-century French women politicians
Women government ministers of France
Women's ministers of France
Politicians from Bourg-en-Bresse
Members of the Borne government